Melrose is both a surname and a given name. Notable people with the surname include:

Surname:
 Alex Melrose (1865–1944), South Australian lawyer and art patron
 Alexander Melrose (1889–1962), South Australian politician
 Barry Melrose (born 1956), former head coach of the National Hockey League's Tampa Bay Lightning & Los Angeles Kings
 Charles James Melrose (1913–1936), Australian aviator and holder of early flight records between Australia and other countries
 David Melrose, Scottish wheelchair curler
 Dianna Melrose (born 1952), British diplomat, ambassador to Cuba
 George Melrose (1806–1894), pioneer in South Australia
 Jim Melrose (born 1958), Scottish footballer
 Joseph Melrose (1944–2014), American diplomat who served as United States Ambassador to Sierra Leone
 Richard Burt Melrose (born 1949), Australian mathematician
 Robert Thomson Melrose (1862–1945), pastoralist and politician in South Australia

Given name: